Adrien Sathler (born 1 June 1992) is a Brazilian-American footballer who plays for Miami Dade FC, as a midfielder.

Career
On May 1, 2014 Sathler signed for Miami Dade FC.

References

1992 births
Living people
Brazilian footballers
Association football midfielders